The Baiu Mountains are mountains in central Romania, a few kilometers south of Brașov.  

Within traditional Romanian classification the Baiu Mountains belong to the Curvature Carpathians. According to the geological divisions of the Carpathians, they belong to the Outer Eastern Carpathians. 

The Baiu Mountains run from the Azuga Valley in the North and to the Posada Gorges in the South, and from the  Doftana Valley in the East to the Prahova Valley in the West.

The Baiu Mountains lie immediately south of the Gârbova Mountains, a long north-south ridge.

See also
List of mountain peaks in Romania
Baiu Mare River

References

External links

 Information on Baiu Mountains at tourist-informator.info
 

Mountain ranges of Romania
Mountain ranges of the Eastern Carpathians